Sandra Day O'Connor High School is a public high school in Helotes, Texas, United States, in the San Antonio metropolitan area. It is a part of the Northside Independent School District.

Overview
Opened in 1998, O'Connor High School followed the tradition of all the Northside high schools in being named after a Supreme Court justice, Sandra Day O'Connor, who served from 1981 to 2006, and was the first female justice on United States Supreme Court. The school colors are navy blue, white, and old gold, and the mascot is the Panther. The first principal was Dr. Ken Patranella, who served from 1998 to 2003. He was succeeded by Mr. Larry Martin, who served as principal from 2003 to 2009. The O'Connor library is named in Mr. Martin's honor. Mr. Robert Martinez is the current principal. O'Connor High School serves the entire town of Helotes along with parts of unincorporated Bexar County and the larger central city of San Antonio. In 2022, the school was rated "Met Standard" by the Texas Education Agency.

In keeping with a low building scale with respect to the rural surroundings, the campus was designed by Marmon Mok, LLP with a "village concept" and now consists of 15 separate main buildings connected by covered walkways, and 7 buildings for the FFA program. Metal roofs, limestone colored split face CMU, and steel siding were used to follow the German Hill Country vernacular style. The campus features a 990-seat auditorium and an 1800-seat competition gymnasium. The electrical feeders and chilled/hot water piping to the buildings are located above the soffits of canopies connecting each building, avoiding costly trenching. To meet an aggressive construction schedule, pre-engineered steel frames were used for all common buildings while classroom buildings G, H, J, and F use a combination of structural steel and reinforced concrete.

To accommodate a student population larger than the 2,400 designed for, a new building including a band hall and dance studio and the multipurpose AG building was built and the cafeteria expanded in 2003. New walkway and bus loop canopies, a canopy to create a covered eating area, and the stair tower for building H were also built in 2003, along with the blacktop marching pad, expansion of the brick-paved courtyard area, and the addition of another chiller. Two new AG barns were built in 2007, and a new two-story classroom building (F) was built in 2012. Despite the additions and the construction of Louis D. Brandeis High School, O’Connor has experienced overcrowding since its opening and has always had over 30 classes in portable buildings.

Athletics
Students can participate in a wide variety of UIL 6A school sports including:
Baseball
Basketball
Cheerleading
Cross Country
Football (Freshman, JV, & Varstiy)
Goldusters Dance Team
Dazzler Drill Team
Starduster Pep Squad
Golf
Soccer
Softball
Swimming & Diving
Tennis
Track
Volleyball

Most school sports have practices and home games at O'Connor High itself. However, the football team, soccer team, and swimming & diving team uses the Dub Farris Athletic Complex off of Loop 1604 and Bamberger Trail for practice and home venues.

Agriculture Science & Technology Academy (ASTA)
In 2021, Northside ISD opened its 7th Magnet High School at Sandra Day O'Connor HS. Previously, students residing in NISD, but not in the O'Connor Zone could apply to a very selective amount of spots for the Agriculture Endorsement. The Northside Board unanimously voted to establish the Agriculture Science & Technology Academy at O'Connor HS. Every year, a class of 250 Freshman residing outside of O'Connor are permitted to attend O'Connor through a lottery system. O'Connor offers 9 Industry Based Certifications through the new magnet school:

 Texas Beef Quality Assurance Certification
 Texas Certified Nursery Professional Certification
 Texas State Floral Certification
 American Welding Society Certification
 Southwest Airlines Professional Communications Certification
 Professional Financial Literacy Certification
 Hunter Safety Certification
 Boater Education Certification
 Certified Veterinary Assistant Certification.

ASTA has its own Administration Team Chad Bohlken serves as the Principal, Thomas Johnson is the Associate Principal, and Bryan Hawkins is the Program Coordinator. The Northside Bond of 2022 allocated $19,100,000 for Agriculture Science Expansion including new barns.

O'Connor has the largest and most expansive Future Farmers of America complex in the Northside Independent School District. The Agriculture Department at O'Connor is a unique program in which students learn a wide variety of agricultural techniques in a hands-on environment. Any students residing in the Northside Independent School District are able to transfer from their zoned high school to attend O'Connor to participate in the agriculture program.  The O'Connor National FFA Organization is one of the largest in the Texas FFA Association.

Band
The Sandra Day O'Connor High School Marching Band has been in existence since the school was opened, and it is one of the largest high school marching bands in Texas, with over 360 members at its height. The band was led by Wallace Dierolf from its inception until 2004. After Dierolf's retirement, the school's newly built multipurpose facility, containing both a band hall and a dance studio, was named after him. When Louis D. Brandeis High School opened in 2008, the band's numbers dropped to 230, but grew back to 380 members. During the COVID-19 pandemic, the band's numbers slightly dropped to 250 due to some members leaving and the social distancing protocols that were in effect. When Dierolf retired, Roland Sandoval took his place and led the band from 2004 to 2018. The current head director is Alfonso Alvarado. Associate Directors are Gabriel Valdéz, Michael Bradford, and José Marín.

Theatre

The O'Connor theatre program was pioneered by the Drama Department director Deann Fleming's (whom has since retired) senior one-act project. It allows fourth-year theatre students to direct their own shows and produce them through via the International Thespian Society at the Texas State and International Thespian Festivals.

Mrs. Fleming's first year at O'Connor included performances of Foxfire, Any Number Can Die, Oklahoma, and The Grapes of Wrath. Year two would consist of Noises Off!, The Music Man, Steel Magnolias and Of Mice and Men.

The production of Of Mice and Men in the 1999–2000 season would be a great success for the school. Two members of the ensemble would go on to win scholarships for their roles in the production, however they would not use them.  The cast competed in the Selena Auditorium at the American Bank Center in Corpus Christi, TX, and won Regionals securing a trip to the International Thespian Festival. The show was featured twice in Lincoln, and the ensemble, production staff, and Mrs. Fleming received great positive from the reviewers.

In addition, the drama students participate as Korny Klowns in the annual Helotes festival Cornyval, an event that allows the students to express themselves creatively and humorously while providing a service to the Helotes community.  The Drama Department is a 6A participant in The University Interscholastic League.

The O'Connor theatre program is currently a part of the Texas Thespian Society Troupe #5872.

Air Force JROTC

O'Connor activated their Air Force JROTC detachment (TX-20082) for the 2008–2009 school year. The current Senior Aerospace Science Instructor is LtCol Jesus Ramos (USAF ret.) and The Aerospace Science Instructor is MSgt Ralph Perez (USAF ret.).  In 2012 the JROTC department, along with the Math department, moved into a newly constructed permanent facility on the northwest side of the campus.

JROTC performs ceremonial Color Guard and Honor Guard for numerous school and Civic Organizations.  They have 13 teams that compete at the local, state and national levels.  Those teams are Cyber Patriot, Marksmanship, female and male Physical Training, Female and Male Color Guard, Armed Drill and Unarmed Drill, and Academic Bowl.  They have won numerous awards over the school year.

Notable awards for the 2016–2017 school year.  Physical training placed in the top three of every competition they entered this year, with the female team capturing first overall in six of twelve competitions.  O'Connor captured the coveted title of overall Grand Champions at Somerset and Kennedy H.S. Drill Meets. Marksmanship placed first at the Lee H.S. Invitational, Wagner, Clark, Kennedy H.S. O'Connor placed a team of 4 shooters and an individual shooter in the Air Force National 3 position Championships in Feb, then 2 shooters qualified for the JROTC Nationals in March. O'Connor competed at the National Drill Championships in Daytona Beach, Florida in May 2017.

JROTC detachments are required to perform community service in addition to teaching an Air Force approved curriculum.  Cadets performed over 4,270 hours of community service in the 2016–2017 school year. They are frequent volunteers at the San Antonio Food Bank, have a long-standing relationship with the Helotes Cornyval Association and Scholarship Beauty Pageant and participate in 6-8 Elementary School Carnivals for Northside Independent School District schools.  They instituted a training program for Kuentz Elementary School's Safety Patrol Squad that raises and lowers the flags every day.

Notable alumni
Boone Logan (Class of 2002) - Major League Baseball pitcher.
Justin Olsen (Class of 2005) - 2010 Winter Olympic Gold Medalist for the U.S. in four-man Bobsleigh
Simran Jeet Singh (Class of 2002) - educator, writer, and activist; 2016 Northside Independent School District Pillar of Respect
JC Caylen (Class of 2011) - Actor and YouTube personality

References

External links
 Sandra Day O'Connor High School official website
 Northside ISD official website

Educational institutions established in 1998
High schools in San Antonio
Public high schools in Bexar County, Texas
Northside Independent School District high schools
1998 establishments in Texas